Tomohito Shugyo (修行 智仁, Shūgyō Tomohito,  born June 29, 1984) is a Japanese football player who play as a Goalkeeper and currently play for FC Imabari.

Career

FC Imabari
FC Imabari announced on 20 December 2018, that they had signed Shugyo.

Career statistics

Club
Updated to the start of 2023 season.

References

External links

Profile at Oita Trinita
Profile at FC Imabari

1984 births
Living people
Ritsumeikan University alumni
Association football people from Osaka Prefecture
Sportspeople from Osaka
Japanese footballers
J2 League players
J3 League players
Japan Football League players
Gainare Tottori players
FC Machida Zelvia players
Oita Trinita players
FC Imabari players
Association football goalkeepers